HERMES was an experiment conducted using the HERA particle accelerator located at the German national laboratory DESY in Hamburg. The experiment's goal was to investigate the quark-gluon structure of matter by examining how a nucleon's constituents affect its spin. It later developed into a pioneering experiment for measuring generalised parton parton distributions and a general-purpose experiment for the study of QCD processes. HERMES completed its first run between 1995 and 2000, and a second run began in 2001 and ended during the summer of 2007.

HERMES was conducted by scientists from more than 13 countries.

Method

Polarized electrons are fired at polarized gas targets. The virtual photon emitted by the electron was also polarized and sought out quarks of spin in the opposite direction as the photon. The asymmetry of ejected quarks was determined to deduce the net polarisation of the quarks.

UGFS

The unpolarized gas feed system (UGFS) was used for non polarized "end of fill" or heavy target running before the polarized target was removed in 2003. Afterwards the UGFS supplied the target gasses in the new detector configuration.

See also 
CLAS
LEPS
HERA
SVD
COMPASS

References

HERMES 
https://web.archive.org/web/20071008230038/http://www.markusehrenfried.de/science/physics/hermes/theheraaccelerat.html
http://nuclear.gla.ac.uk/~protopop/teaching/gui/

External links 

 HERMES experiment record on INSPIRE-HEP

Particle experiments